A list of animated television series first aired in 2004.

See also
 List of animated feature films of 2004
 List of Japanese animation television series of 2004

References

Television series
Animated series
2004
2004
2004-related lists